Vanessa Raj (born January 6, 1996 in Penang) is a professional squash player who represents Malaysia. She reached a career-high world ranking of World No. 57 in November 2015.

References

External links 
 
 

1996 births
Living people
Malaysian female squash players
Malaysian people of Indian descent
People from Penang
Asian Games medalists in squash
Asian Games bronze medalists for Malaysia
Squash players at the 2014 Asian Games
Medalists at the 2014 Asian Games
Southeast Asian Games medalists in squash
Southeast Asian Games gold medalists for Malaysia
Southeast Asian Games silver medalists for Malaysia
Competitors at the 2015 Southeast Asian Games
21st-century Malaysian women